Ray Lee Tolbert (born September 10, 1958) is an American former professional basketball player who was selected by the New Jersey Nets in the first round (18th pick overall) of the 1981 NBA draft. A  power forward from Indiana University, Tolbert played in five NBA seasons for six different teams. He played for the Nets, Seattle SuperSonics, Detroit Pistons, New York Knicks, Los Angeles Lakers and Atlanta Hawks.

During the senior year of his collegiate career in 1981, starters Tolbert, Landon Turner, Isiah Thomas, Randy Wittman, and Ted Kitchel led Indiana to its fourth NCAA championship and Coach Bob Knight's second.

In his NBA career, he played in 261 games and scored a total of 928 points.

He later became the coach of the ABA's Anderson Champions.

He currently resides in Fishers, Indiana where he is the Varsity Assistant at Fishers High School.

Notes

External links
College & NBA stats @ basketballreference.com

1958 births
Living people
African-American basketball coaches
African-American basketball players
American Basketball Association (2000–present) coaches
American expatriate basketball people in Italy
American expatriate basketball people in Spain
American men's basketball players
Atlanta Hawks players
Basketball players at the 1979 Pan American Games
Basketball players from Indiana
Bay State Bombardiers players
Detroit Pistons players
Fort Wayne Fury players
Indiana Hoosiers men's basketball players
La Crosse Catbirds players
Liga ACB players
Los Angeles Lakers players
McDonald's High School All-Americans
Medalists at the 1979 Pan American Games
New Jersey Nets draft picks
New Jersey Nets players
New York Knicks players
Pan American Games gold medalists for the United States
Pan American Games medalists in basketball
Parade High School All-Americans (boys' basketball)
People from Fishers, Indiana
Power forwards (basketball)
Seattle SuperSonics players
Sportspeople from Anderson, Indiana
Tampa Bay Thrillers players
21st-century African-American people
20th-century African-American sportspeople